Dartmouth Academy is a non-selective, co-educational school within the English Academy programme, in Dartmouth, Devon, in the south-west of England. The academy was opened in September 2010 following the merger of two schools, Dartmouth Community College and Dartmouth Primary School. It is an all-through school. Since becoming an academy, it is open to students aged 3 to 16.

Ofsted results 
The Academy received its most recent Ofsted report in 2017, where it scored a 'Good'.

Vision and ethos
Dartmouth Academy has the school motto of 'Be Your Best Self'.
The school's vision and ethos statement states that it aims to build long-lasting relationships with pupils and their families, being at the heart of the community. 
Its shared aim is communicated as building the foundations for children's current and future happiness and success.

Building and facilities

The Academy has a modern, purpose-built school building. This finished construction and was opened in September 2010.

Sponsor and affiliations
The Academy is part of the Education South West Multi Academy Trust (ESW).
It is affiliated with local partner Britannia Royal Naval College, a center for the training of Royal Navy Officers.

Pupils at Dartmouth Academy benefit from close links with community groups, such as the Royal Dart Yacht Club, the Flavel Art Centre and the Dart Food Festival.

From September 2021, it will be a Devon Music Hub for local primary schools.

The Academy also aims to work extensively with Devon County Council and to form close working relationships with local primary and secondary schools, both those within ESW and externally.

References

External links
 Dartmouth Academy

Academies in Devon
Educational institutions established in 2010
Secondary schools in Devon
Primary schools in Devon
Dartmouth, Devon
2010 establishments in England